Felicity Christiana Buchan (born 1970) is a British politician serving as Parliamentary Under-Secretary of State for Housing and Homelessness in the  Department for Levelling Up, Housing and Communities since October 2022. She served as Exchequer Secretary to the Treasury from September to October 2022. She is the Member of Parliament (MP) for Kensington in London since 2019. A member of the Conservative Party, she worked in investment banking for JPMorgan Chase and Bank of America prior to her political career.

Early life and education
Buchan was born in Fraserburgh, Aberdeenshire, Scotland, the daughter of Charles and Georgina Buchan. She attended the Fraserburgh Academy comprehensive school in Fraserburgh and subsequently studied law at Christ Church, Oxford.

Financial career
Buchan worked for a decade at American investment bank JPMorgan Chase in their syndicate and capital markets division and was promoted to vice president of their European syndicate. She left the company in 2001 to join Bank of America as a managing director in its debt capital markets division. As of September 2022, she holds at least £70,000 of shares in both companies.

After leaving the financial services industry, she volunteered at a North Kensington children's charity and was the chair of governors of Bousfield Primary School.

Political career
Buchan contested South Down in Northern Ireland as a Conservative candidate in the 2015 general election, coming last with 318 (0.7%) votes.  She then contested the South Shields seat in Tyne and Wear in 2017, where she came second to the incumbent Labour Party MP, Emma Lewell-Buck, with 10,570 (25.9%) votes. During the 2017 campaign, Buchan wrote an article for the website BrexitCentral in which discussed her support for "a tough Brexit deal: that means leaving the Single Market, the Customs Union and the ECJ" and decried a London-centric view of politics.

She was selected as the Conservative candidate for Kensington on 16 July 2019. Buchan had been the treasurer and a member of the board for the Kensington Chelsea & Fulham Conservatives Local Association, roles she had held until 2019. When asked about her prior comments on Brexit during her 2017 campaign, she stated that she had "always campaigned for a good negotiated deal" and that she was not in favour of a "hard Brexit". She was elected as MP in the 2019 general election with a majority of 150. After her election, she pledged to accept and help to implement the recommendations of the Grenfell Tower Inquiry "with a sense of urgency". The purpose of the inquiry is to investigate the Grenfell Tower fire which occurred in 2017 in North Kensington, which lies within her constituency. She was a member of the Treasury Select Committee between March 2020 and December 2021. Buchan has been a member of the Finance Committee since March 2020.

On 7 September 2020, Buchan voted against a Labour Party amendment to the Fire Safety Bill which was intended to implement the recommendations of the first phase of the Grenfell Tower Inquiry before the end of the consultation process. This was criticised by campaign group Grenfell United and opposition politicians. She defended her vote by stating the government was "committed to implementing the recommendations", and criticised the Labour Party for "misrepresenting the vote" for political reasons.

On 23 August 2021, Prime Minister Boris Johnson appointed Buchan as the UK's trade envoy to Iceland and Norway. Buchan was appointed as a Parliamentary Private Secretary in the Department for Business, Energy and Industrial Strategy in September 2021. Buchan resigned from her PPS role on 6 July 2022, in protest against the leadership of Prime Minister Boris Johnson over his handling of the Chris Pincher scandal. After the election of Liz Truss as Prime Minister in September 2022, Buchan was appointed as Exchequer Secretary to the Treasury.

After Truss resigned and was succeeded by Rishi Sunak, Buchan was appointed as Parliamentary Under Secretary of State for Housing and Homelessness in the Department for Levelling Up, Housing and Communities in October 2022.

Personal life 
Buchan is a member of the Chelsea Arts Club.

References

External links

1970 births
21st-century British women politicians
21st-century Scottish women politicians
Alumni of Christ Church, Oxford
Bank of America people
Conservative Party (UK) MPs for English constituencies
Female members of the Parliament of the United Kingdom for English constituencies
JPMorgan Chase people
Living people
People educated at Fraserburgh Academy
People from Fraserburgh
UK MPs 2019–present